The Oxford Synthesiser Company (OSC) was a small British synthesizer manufacturer, active during the early 1980s. It was founded in 1982 by electronics design engineer Chris Huggett, with Paul Wiffen, after Electronic Dream Plant folded.

Products 

 OSC OSCar

Related companies 

 Electronic Dream Plant (EDP)
 Novation, co-developers with Chris Huggett since the 1990s.

References 

Synthesizer manufacturing companies of the United Kingdom
Musical instrument manufacturing companies of the United Kingdom